Josef Čihák (born 19 March 1963) is a former professional tennis player from the Czech Republic who competed for Czechoslovakia. He now works as a tennis coach at TK Sparta Praha.

Career
Čihák was most successful as a doubles player, reaching two doubles finals in the 1989 Grand Prix, at Båstad and Saint-Vincent, winning the latter. He had previously made doubles semi-finals at Prague and Palermo in 1987 and also Prague and Munich in 1988. As well reaching those two finals in 1989, Čihák was also a semi-finalist at the Athens Open, in the singles.

At Grand Slam level he lost all of his four singles matches. The toughest opponent he came up against was Mats Wilander in the 1988 French Open, the number three seed who went on to win the tournament. He lost two five setters in 1989, at Roland Garros and Wimbledon. In doubles he won four of his 10 matches, but never made it past the second round, which he reached on four occasions, three times with countryman Cyril Suk as his partner.

Grand Prix career finals

Doubles: 2 (1–1)

Challenger titles

Singles: (3)

Doubles: (11)

References

External links
 
 

1963 births
Living people
Czech male tennis players
Czechoslovak male tennis players
Sportspeople from Plzeň